The Northern Styrian Alps (Steirische Nordalpen in German) is the proposed name for a subdivision of mountain ranges in an as-yet-unadopted classification of the Alps located in Austria.

Geography 
Administratively the range belongs to the Austrian state of Styria and, marginally, to Upper Austria and Lower Austria.
The whole range is drained by the Danube river.

SOIUSA classification 
According to SOIUSA (International Standardized Mountain Subdivision of the Alps) the mountain range is an Alpine section, classified in the following way:
 main part = Eastern Alps
 major sector = Northern Limestone Alps
 section = Northern Styrian Alps
 code = II/B-26

Subdivision 
The range is divided in two Alpine subsections:
 Ennstal Alps - SOIUSA code:II/B-26.I;
 North-eastern Styrian Alps - SOIUSA code:II/B-26.II;

These subsections are further subdivided in supergroups as it follows:
 Ennstal Alps:
 supergroup Haller Mauern - SOIUSA code:II/B-26.I-A,
 supergroup Gesäuse - SOIUSA code:II/B-26.I-B,
 supergroup Eisenerzer Alpen - SOIUSA code:II/B-26.I-C.
 North-eastern Styrian Alps:
 supergroup Hochschwabgruppe - SOIUSA code:II/B-26.II-A,
 supergroup Mürzsteger Alpen - SOIUSA code:II/B-26.II-B,
 supergroup Rax-Schneeberg-Gruppe - SOIUSA code:II/B-26.II-C.

Notable summits

Some notable summits of the range are:

References

Mountain ranges of the Alps
Mountain ranges of Upper Austria
Mountain ranges of Lower Austria
Mountain ranges of Styria